Mai Yamada is a Taiwanese politician.

Early life
Mai was born to a Taiwanese mother and Japanese father from Toyama Prefecture. Her father passed away when she was a child. During university time, she had been involved in politics.

Early careers
She used to work at the office of Kao Jyh-peng (高志鵬), a Democratic Progressive Party (DPP) lawmaker where she became the deputy director. She also served as the campaign assistant of Yu Tian for the Legislative Yuan by-election in 2019. She was the secretary of Legislative Yuan President You Si-kun.

Political careers
In autumn 2021, Mai decided to join the local election of 2022. She was then elected as the councilor of New Taipei City Council after the 2022 Republic of China local election on 26 December 2022 under the DPP.

Personal life
Mai is fluent in English and Japanese. She also learned Hokkien.

References

External links
 

21st-century Taiwanese women politicians
Democratic Progressive Party (Taiwan) politicians
New Taipei City Councilors
Taiwanese people of Japanese descent
Living people
Year of birth missing (living people)